Osorno Básquetbol was a Chilean basketball club based in Osorno, Los Lagos Region. The club was established on November 19, 2009. The club played in the Liga Nacional de Chile.

The Liga Nacional home games were played at the Gimnasio María Gallardo; some of the Liga Saesa games were played at the Gimansio Español.

The club was expelled from the Liga Nacional in February 2019 for two years, and the club itself was folded due to the financial difficulties.

Trophies
 Liga Saesa/Libsur: 1
2014

Coaches 

 Ricardo Bello (2010)

 Mario Negrón (2011-2012)

 Juan Manuel Córdoba (2012-2015)

 Rodrigo Isbej (2015-2017)

 Carlos Schwarzenberg (2017)

 Eddie Bermúdez (2017)

 Jorge Arrieta (2017)

 Yudi Abreu (2018)

 Rodrigo Isbej (2018-2019)

References

External links
Official Facebook account (without activity since April 2019)

Basketball teams in Chile
Basketball teams established in 2009
Sport in Los Lagos Region
Osorno, Chile
2009 establishments in Chile
2019 disestablishments in Chile
Defunct basketball teams